Yoseph Bar-Cohen is a physicist at the Jet Propulsion Laboratory who specializes in electroactive materials and ultrasonic nondestructive evaluation (NDE), and is responsible for the Nondestructive Evaluation and Advance Actuators (NDEAA) lab at JPL. Dr. Bar-Cohen is a fellow of the International Society for Optical Engineering (SPIE) and the American Society for Nondestructive Testing (ASNT).

Bar-Cohen received a M.Sc. in Materials Science in 1973 and a Ph.D. in Physics in 1979, both from the Hebrew University in Jerusalem.

Bar-Cohen started SPIE's Electroactive Polymer Actuators and Devices (EAPAD) conference, which he has chaired six times, as well as proposing the Armwrestling Match of EAP Robotic Arm Against Human.

External links
Dr. Bar-Cohen's biography at JPL

21st-century American physicists
Hebrew University of Jerusalem alumni
Living people
Year of birth missing (living people)